Pyrausta nicalis is a moth in the family Crambidae. It was described by Augustus Radcliffe Grote in 1878. It is found in North America, where it has been recorded from Quebec west to British Columbia, south to Colorado, Utah, Nevada and California.

The wingspan is 20–23 mm. The forewings and hindwings are fuscous, tinged with red or purple, and both with a pale buff postmedial line. Adults are on wing from late May to mid-August.

The larvae possibly feed on Mentha species.

References

Moths described in 1878
nicalis
Moths of North America